Psilotagma is a genus of moths in the family Geometridae described by Warren in 1894.

Species
Psilotagma decorata Warren, 1894
Psilotagma pictaria (Moore, 1888)

References

External links

Pseudoterpnini
Geometridae genera